Iyasa (Yasa, Yassa) is a Bantu language spoken in Cameroon and Equatorial Guinea by the Iyasa and Ndowe coastal fishing peoples.  It is also spoken by Pygmies, perhaps Babongo, in Gabon. Approximately 3,000 people speak Iyasa, though some note that this number may be an overestimation.

Iyasa also goes by the names Bongwe, Lyaasa, and Maasa. Dialects are Bweko, Vendo, Bodele, Marry, One, Asonga, Bomui, Mogana, Mooma, Mapanga. It may in turn be a dialect of Kombe. Speakers report that Kombe and Iyasa are almost perfectly mutually intelligible.

Classification 
Dieu and Renaud (1993) classify Iyasa as a Sawabantu language (A.30 in Guthrie classification).

Geographic Distribution 
Iyasa is spoken along the coast of Cameroon south of Kribi, including in the city of Campo. It is also spoken across the Ntem River in Equatorial Guinea. The northernmost Iyasa village is Lolabe, 31 km south of Kribi.

Phonology 
Iyasa has a seven-vowel system: 

It also has 22 phonemic consonants:

Grammar

Noun classes 
Iyasa has 12 noun classes, as outlined in the table below (adapted from Bôt 2011 and Bouh Ma Sitna 2004):

References

External links 
 Iyasa page at the Endangered Languages Project
 Homepage of the Iyasa language committee
 Etomba a Iyasa Facebook group
 Paradisec has an open access collection of Roger Blench's materials (RB5) that includes Yasa language materials

Definitely endangered languages
Languages of Cameroon
Languages of Equatorial Guinea
Languages of Gabon
Sawabantu languages